is a Japanese voice actor and stage actor who was born in Hachiōji. He is currently affiliated with Mausu Promotion and is representative of Theater Company K-Show. He has taken over some of the roles held by the late Kazuyuki Sogabe and Takeshi Aono. His range is baritone.

Biography
After graduating from Meijigakuin Higashimurayama High School, Itō had the opportunity to help out with a theater company that he knew, and became interested in the "world of performance" for the first time. In 1993, he entered the drama department of Toho Gakuen College of Drama and Music, and in the summer of the same year, he appeared on stage for the first time in Little Women. In 1995, he joined Theater Company 21st Century FOX led by Kaneta Kimotsuki, and at the same time, he sought a performance-related career and made his debut as a voice actor. 2001 to April 2009, he belonged to Haikyo, and from May 2009 to 2010, he belonged to Mediarte. He has been a member of Amuleto (formerly ARKRAY) since 2011, and then became a member of Mausu Promotion on June 1, 2016.

Filmography

Anime roles 
 Altair: A Record of Battles – Alois Reuss
 Ai no Kusabi (remake) – Riki
 Air Master – Kitaeda Kinjiro
 Akuma no Riddle – Eisuke Inukai
 Ao no Exorcist – Shiratori/Astaroth
 Baby Steps – Takayuki Okada
 Bakusō Kyōdai Let's & Go!! WGP – Brett Astaire
 Beelzebub – Hecadoth
 Big Windup! – Tomoya Takii
Black Clover – Randall Luftair
 Blade of the Immortal – Shido Hishiyasu
 Bleach – Renji Abarai
 Blood+ – Akihiro Okamura
 Brynhildr in the Darkness – Kogorou Hashiratani
 Buso Renkin – Washio
 Captain Tsubasa: Road to Dream 2002 – Ken Wakashimazu
 Ceres, The Celestial Legend – Yūhi Aogiri
 Chou sei Kantai Sazer-X – Fire Shogun Blaird
 Cyborg 009 – Cyborg 0013
 D.Gray Man – Level 3 Akuma
 Dai-Guard – Shunsuke Akagi
 Demonbane – Daijuuji Kurou
 Dokkiri Doctor – Rokoro Shibuya
 Doraemon: Zeusdesu Naida – Kumo-Kotojin
 Digimon Adventure – Yukidarumon
 Digimon Frontier – Katsuharu
 Digimon Xros Wars – Fanglongmon
 Eden – E92
 Ergo Proxy – Pull
 Fire Force 2nd Season – Schop
 Flame of Recca – Minamio
 Forza! Hidemaru – Kaizer
 Fullmetal Alchemist – Barry the Chopper
 Gilgamesh – Fujisaki Isamu
 Gintama – Sasaki Tetsunosuke
 Golden Kamuy – Yoshitake Shiraishi
 Great Teacher Onizuka – Punk
 Hamtaro – Taisho-kun (Boss)
 Happiness! – Shinya Kamijyō
 Hikaru no Go – Tetsuo Kaga
 Ikoku Irokoi Romantan – Ranmaru Ōmi
 JoJo's Bizarre Adventure: Stardust Crusaders – N'Doul
 Junjo Romantica – Hiroki Kamijo
 King's Raid: Successors of the Will – Marduk
 Kōtetsu Sangokushi – Taishi Ci
 Kyou Kara Maoh! – Alford Markina
 Kiniro no Corda (a.k.a. La Corda D'Oro) – Ryoutaro Tsuchiura
 Kiniro no Corda Blue Sky – Yukihiro Yagisawa
 Kingdom – Kan Ki
 The Law of Ueki – Guitar
 Maju Sensen The Apocalypse – Shin'ichi Kuruma
 MÄR – Mr. Hook
 Martian Successor Nadesico and Martian Successor Nadesico: The Prince of Darkness – Jun Aoi
 Rockman EXE series – Shadowman
 Mirmo! – Ichirou, Hirai
 Momoko Kaeru no Utaga Ki Koeruyo – Kuroki Senjou
 Mobile Suit Gundam AGE – Zel Plant
 Naruto – Choji Akimichi
 Naruto: Shippuden – Choji Akimichi
 Needless – Momiji Teruyama
 Nurarihyon no Mago – Hakuzouzu
 One Piece – Fukaboshi
 Pocket Monsters – Race Announcer, Mizuki, Seiji, Ghali, Norio, Tobio
 Papuwa – Kintaro
 Ryusei no Rockman – War-Rock
 Rental Magica – Hyodo
 Saint Seiya: The Lost Canvas – Mandrake Fyodor
 Saint Seiya: Soul of Gold – Níðhöggr Fáfnir
 Saiunkoku Monogatari – Rou Ensei
 Seven Knights Revolution: Hero Successor – Spike
 Shenmue: The Animation – Charlie 
 Super Doll★Licca-chan – Doll Isamu
 Strange Dawn – Shall
 Subete ga F ni Naru – Chikara Mizutani
 Superior Defender Gundam Force – Deathscythe
 Q Transformer: Saranaru Ninkimono e no Michi – Skywarp
 Tokyo Ghoul – Banjou Kazuichi
 To Love-Ru – Hittakun
 Yowamushi Pedal – Jin Tadokoro
 Yu-Gi-Oh! GX – Brron
 Zombie-Loan – Asou Sotetsu

Character themes 
 Bleach Beat Collection – Renji Abarai
 "Rosa Rubicundior, Lilio Candidior"
 "Standing to Defend You"
 "Gomi Tamemitai na Machi de Oretachi wa Deatta"
 Dynasty Warrior 8 Character Image Song ~Wei~ – Yue Jin
 "THE FORERUNNER"

Drama CDs 
 1K Apartment no Koi (Naomichi Ootomo)
 Afuresou na Pool (Kizu Ryouji)
 Aijin Incubus (Tsukasa Mikuriya)
 Aigan Shonen (Kitamura)
 Akanai Tobira (Mori)
 Ai no Kusabi (2007-2010) (Riki)
 Bad Medicine -Infectious Teachers- (Yanagi Ryota)
 Bleach Volume 1: The Night Before the Execution (Renji Abarai)
 Bleach Volume 2: Hanatarou's Lost Item (Renji Abarai)
 Bleach Volume 3: The Night Before the Confusion (Renji Abarai)
 Boxer Wa Inu Ni Naru series 1: Boxer Wa Inu Ni Naru (Touru Hashiguchi)
 Boxer Wa Inu Ni Naru series 2: Doctor Wa Inu wo Kau (Touru Hashiguchi)
 Boxer Wa Inu Ni Naru series 3: Raibaru mo Inu wo Daku (Touru Hashiguchi)
 Dear (Kurenai)
 Junjou Romantica (Hiroki Kamijou)
 Hana-Kimi (Kayashima Taiki)
 Kageki series 5: Kageki ni Tengoku (Angel 2)
 Konna Joushi ni Damasarete 1 & 2 (Toshiya Aoyama)
 Mizu no Kioku (Kouta Sasaki)
 Muteki na Bokura series 1 (Shouichirou Kaga)
 Muteki na Bokura series 2: Oogami Datte Kowakunai (Shouichirou Kaga)
 Muteki na Bokura series 3: Shoubu wa Korekara! (Shouichirou Kaga)
 Muteki na Bokura series 4: Saikyou na Yatsura (Shouichirou Kaga)
 Muteki na Bokura series Side Story 1: Aitsu ni Muchuu (Shouichirou Kaga)
 Netsujou no Ori de Nemure (Morinaga)
 Ousama na Neko (Theta & Shirou Nabeshima)
 Oyaji Hiroimashita (Ryouji Saeki)
 Sakurazawa vs Hakuhou Series 2: Houkengo no Nayameru Kankei (Kyousuku Sonoda)
 Shiawase ni Shite Agemasu (Tokio Mouri)
 Solid Love (Taiyou Azuma)
 Soryamou Aideshou 1 & 2 (Kyou Akiba)

Video games 
 Black Matrix – Zero
 Bleach: Blade Battlers – Renji Abarai
 Bleach: Blade Battlers 2 – Renji Abarai
 Bleach: Heat the Soul 2 – Renji Abarai
 Bleach: Heat the Soul 3 – Renji Abarai
 Bleach: Heat the Soul 4 – Renji Abarai
 Bleach: Shattered Blade – Renji Abarai
 Breath of Fire: Dragon Quarter – Bosch
 Captain Tsubasa Dream Team – Yuji Soga
 Daemon Bride – Asuma Shidou/Satan
 Dragon Force (PS2 remake) – Mikhal of Izumo
 Dragon Shadow Spell – Sig
 Dynasty Warriors 8 – Yue Jin
 Enchanted Arms – Ooka
 GioGio's Bizarre Adventure – Guido Mista
 Granblue Fantasy – Souval Vanguard (Event Side-Character)
 Hyperdimension Neptunia Mk2 – CFW Brave
 JoJo's Bizarre Adventure: Eyes of Heaven – N'Doul
 Kiniro no Corda series – Ryoutaro Tsuchiura, Yukihiro Yagisawa
 Last Escort 2: Shinya no Amai Toge - Naoya Ryuuzaki
 Mugen Souls – Vorgis
 Rockman X4 – X
 Star Ocean: The First Departure – Dorn Marto
 Street Fighter III 3rd Strike – Yun
 Super Street Fighter IV Arcade Edition – Yun
 Super Robot Wars series – Shunsuke Akagi, Kurou Daijuuji, Jun Aoi
 Tales of Phantasia (PlayStation remake) – Chester Barklight
 Togainu no Chi (PS2 remake) – Touya
 Ys: The Oath in Felghana (PSP port) – Chester Stoddart

PC games 
 Clannad – Tomoya Okazaki (visual novel)
 Yuusha (You Can't Escape from the Heroine) – Maou Saga (Hentai Posing Battle Fantasy)

Tokusatsu 
 Ninpuu Sentai Hurricanger – Excavation Ninja Mogudrago (ep. 4)
 Chousei Kantai Sazer-X – Fire General Blaird
 Engine Sentai Go-Onger – Savage Water Barbaric Machine Beast Manhole Banki (ep. 28)
 Uchu Sentai Kyuranger – Toome (ep. 7)
 Kamen Rider Heisei Generations Forever – Another Double

Dubbing roles

Live-action 
 After Earth – Hesper Pilot (Sacha Dhawan)
 American Outlaws – Cole Younger (Scott Caan)
 Annapolis – McNally (Chi McBride)
 Ant-Man – Dave (Tip "T.I." Harris)
 Ant-Man and the Wasp – Dave (Tip "T.I." Harris)
 Below – Ensign Douglas Odell (Matthew Davis)
 Brooklyn 99 – Charles Boyle (Joe Lo Truglio)
 Creed – "Pretty" Ricky Conlan (Anthony Bellew)
 Crimson Rivers II: Angels of the Apocalypse – Capitaine Reda (Benoît Magimel)
 The Devil's Double – Latif Yahia / Uday Hussein (Dominic Cooper)
 DodgeBall: A True Underdog Story – Justin Redman (Justin Long)
 Dracula Untold – Mehmed II (Dominic Cooper)
 The Duchess – Charles Grey, 2nd Earl Grey (Dominic Cooper)
 Eight Legged Freaks – Harlan Griffith (Doug E. Doug)
 Eragon – Murtagh (Garrett Hedlund)
 Exit Wounds – George Clark (Isaiah Washington)
 Final Destination (2002 TV Asahi edition) – Carter Horton (Kerr Smith)
 Flyboys – Eugene Skinner (Abdul Salis)
 Ghost Rider – Blackheart / Legion (Wes Bentley)
 Girl – Mathias Verhaeghen
 Grudge Match – Dante Slate, Jr. (Kevin Hart)
 Guess Who – Simon Green (Ashton Kutcher)
 Half Past Dead – Nicolas "Nick" Frazier (Ja Rule)
 Jumanji: Welcome to the Jungle – Franklin "Mouse" Finbar (Kevin Hart)
 Jumper – Griffin O'Connor (Jamie Bell)
 Let's Be Cops – Mossi Kasic (James D'Arcy)
 The Meg – Jack Morris (Rainn Wilson)
 The Rebound – Yael (Elliot Villar)
 Remember the Titans – Gerry Bertier (Ryan Hurst)
 Resident Evil: The Final Chapter – Christian (William Levy)
 The Rookie – Joaquin "Wack" Campos (Jay Hernandez)
 Rottweiler – Dante (William Miller)
 Scooby-Doo – Voodoo Maestro (Miguel A. Núñez Jr.)
 Setup – Sonny (50 Cent)
 Seven Pounds – Ben Thomas (Michael Ealy)
 A Star Is Born – George "Noodles" Stone (Dave Chappelle)
 Straight Outta Compton – Andre "Dr. Dre" Young (Corey Hawkins)
 Teenage Mutant Ninja Turtles – Leonardo
 Terminator 3: Rise of the Machines (2005 NTV edition) – Scott Mason (Mark Famiglietti)
 Tokyo Raiders – Pat Tai-yung (Ekin Cheng)
 True Detective (season 2) – Paul Woodrugh (Taylor Kitsch)
 A Walk to Remember – Landon Rollins Carter (Shane West)
 Wayward Pines – Sheriff Pope (Terrence Howard)
 We Are Marshall – Nate Ruffin (Anthony Mackie)
 You're Next – Felix Davison

Animation 
 Epic – Mub
 My Little Pony: Friendship Is Magic – Rover
 Stanley – Harry the Dog
 Transformers Animated – Lugnut

References

External links 
  
 
 
 
 

1974 births
Living people
Japanese male video game actors
Japanese male voice actors
Male voice actors from Tokyo Metropolis
Voice actors from Hachiōji, Tokyo
Musicians from Hachiōji, Tokyo
20th-century Japanese male actors
21st-century Japanese male actors